First-seeded Margaret Osborne duPont defeated Doris Hart 6–3, 6–3 in the final to win the women's singles tennis title at the 1950 U.S. National Championships.

Seeds
The six seeded U.S. players are listed below. Margaret Osborne duPont is the champion; others show in brackets the round in which they were eliminated.

  Margaret Osborne duPont (champion)
  Doris Hart (finalist)
  Louise Brough (third round)
  Beverly Baker (semifinals)
  Pat Canning Todd (quarterfinals)
  Shirley Fry (quarterfinals)

Draw

Key
 Q = Qualifier
 WC = Wild card
 LL = Lucky loser
 r = Retired

Final eight

References

1950
1950 in women's tennis
1950 in American women's sports
Women's Singles